This is a list of notable people from Estonia, or of Estonian ancestry.

Architects

Andres Alver (born 1953)
Dmitri Bruns (1929–2020)
Karl Burman (1882–1965)
Eugen Habermann (1884–1944)
Georg Hellat (1870–1943)
Otto Pius Hippius (1826–1883)
Erich Jacoby (1885–1941)
Herbert Johanson (1884–1964)
Peep Jänes (born 1936)
Louis I. Kahn (1901–1974) (USA) 
Raine Karp (born 1939)
Alar Kotli (1904–1963)
Edgar-Johan Kuusik (1888–1974)
Ernst Gustav Kühnert (1885–1961)
Vilen Künnapu (born 1948) 
Elmar Lohk (1901–1963)
Ülar Mark (born 1968)
Margit Mutso (born 1966)
Robert Natus (1890–1950)
Uno Prii (1924–2000)
Raivo Puusepp (born 1960)
Jacques Rosenbaum (1878–1943)
Eugen Sacharias (1906–2002)
Olev Siinmaa (1881–1948)
Elmar Tampõld (1920–2013)

Business and politics
Hardo Aasmäe (1951–2014), geographer, politician, encyclopedist 
Andrus Ansip (born 1956), politician, former prime minister 
Jaan Anvelt (1884–1937), politician
Ado Birk (1883–1942), politician
Ivi Eenmaa (born 1943), librarian and politician
Kaarel Eenpalu (Karl Einbund, 1888–1942), politician
Ene Ergma (born 1944), politician
Magnus Gabriel De la Gardie (1622–1686), politician (Sweden)
Karoli Hindriks (born 1983), entrepreneur
Toomas Hendrik Ilves (born 1953), journalist, politician, former president 
Ernst Jaakson (1905–1998), diplomat
Steve Jurvetson (born 1967), businessman (United States)
Kaja Kallas (born 1977), politician, prime minister (since 2021) 
Siim Kallas (born 1948), politician, former prime minister
Carmen Kass (born 1978), supermodel, businesswoman, and politician
Tunne Kelam (born 1936), politician
Tõnis Kint (1896–1991), politician, prime minister in exile 
August Koern (1900–1989), diplomat, foreign minister in exile 
Eerik-Niiles Kross (born 1967), diplomat, politician
Mart Laar (born 1960), historian, politician, former prime minister 
Rein Lang (born 1957), journalist, businessman, politician
Robert Lepikson (1952–2006), businessman, politician
Peeter Lepp (born 1943), politician
Jürgen Ligi (born 1959), politician
Elmar Lipping (1906–1994), politician, foreign minister in exile 
Hjalmar Mäe (1901–1978), politician, head of self-administration during German occupation
Tiit Made (born 1940), journalist, politician
Linnart Mäll (1938–2010), orientalist, politician
Harry Männil (1920–2010), businessman, art collector
Heinrich Mark (1911–2004), politician, former prime minister in exile
Jaan Manitski (born 1942), businessman, politician, former foreign minister  
Lennart Meri (1929–2006), writer, filmmaker, foreign minister, president 
Jüri Mõis (born 1956), businessman, politician 
Ülo Nugis (1944–2011), politician, economist
Kristiina Ojuland (born 1966), politician, former foreign minister 
Lembit Öpik (born 1965), politician (United Kingdom) 
Rein Otsason (1931–2004), economist, businessman
Siiri Oviir (born 1947), politician
Ivari Padar (born 1965), politician
Tõnis Palts (born 1953), politician, businessman
Sir Arvi Parbo (1926–2019), businessman (Australia)
Juhan Parts (born 1966), politician, former prime minister
Keit Pentus (born 1976), politician
Hanno Pevkur (born 1977), politician
Jüri Pihl (born 1954), politician
Konstantin Päts (1874–1956), journalist, politician, first president of Estonia
Jaan Poska (1866–1920), diplomat, politician 
Valdo Randpere (born 1958), businessman, musician
August Rei (1886–1963), diplomat, politician, prime minister head of state
Alfred Rosenberg (1893–1946), politician, ideologist, war criminal (Nazi Germany) 
Arnold Rüütel (born 1928), agricultural manager, politician, former president
Edgar V. Saks (1910–1984), statesman, historian, author
Edgar Savisaar (born 1950), politician, former prime minister 
Johannes Sikkar (1897–1960), politician
Artur Sirk (1900–1937), officer, lawyer, politician
Otto Strandman (1875–1941), politician, prime minister, head of state
Rein Taagepera (born 1933), political scientist, politician
Jaak Tamm (1950–1999), politician
Alexei Tammet-Romanov (1935–1977), Romanov impostor
Andres Tarand (born 1940), politician, former prime minister 
Indrek Tarand (born 1964), politician, journalist
Enn Tarto (1938–2021), anti-Soviet dissident, politician
Otto Tief (1889–1976), military officer, politician 
Jaan Tõnisson (1868–1941?), journalist, politician 
Anton Uesson (1879–1942), politician, engineer 
Jüri Uluots (1890–1945), lawyer, politician 
Priit Willbach (born 1953), businessman, politician 
Jüri Vilms (1889–1918), lawyer, politician, first deputy prime minister 
Toomas Vilosius (born 1951), physician, politician 
Tiit Vähi (born 1947), businessman, politician, former prime minister 
Aleksander Warma (1890–1970), navy officer, diplomat, prime minister in exile

Education and science

Julius Aamisepp (1883–1950), agricultural scientist
Johannes Aavik (1880–1973), linguist
Jüri Allik (born 1949), psychologist
Paul Ariste (1905–1990), linguist
Karl Ernst von Baer (1792–1876), biologist 
Girsh Blumberg (born 1959),  American - Estonian experimental physicist
Karl Ernst Claus (1796–1864), chemist 
Georg Dehio (1850–1932), art historian 
Jaan Einasto (born 1929), astrophysicist
Johann Friedrich Eschscholtz  (1793–1831), entomologist 
Bengt Gottfried Forselius (c. 1660–1688), founder of public education
Johannes Hint (1914–1985), physicist, inventor
Jakob Hurt (1839–1906), linguist, collector of folklore 
Paul Kogerman (1891–1951), chemist
Wolfgang Köhler (1887–1967), psychologist 
Nikolai Köstner (1889–1959), economist, politician
Eerik Kumari (1912–1984), ornithologist
Helga Kurm (1920–2011), dean of the Tartu State University Pedagogical Division
Heinrich Lenz (1804–1865), physicist 
Elmar Leppik (1898–1978), biologist
Otto Liiv (1905–1942), historian, archivist
Endel Lippmaa (1930–2015), chemist, physicist, politician
Mihhail Lotman (born 1952), semiotician 
Juri Lotman (1922–1993), semiotician 
Richard Karlovich Maack (1825–1886), geographer, botanist, Siberian explorer, educator
Friedrich Martens (1845–1909), diplomat, international lawyer
Viktor Masing (1925–2001), ecologist
Harri Moora (1900–1968), archaeologist
Ragnar Nurkse (1907–1959), economist
Ernst Öpik (1893–1985), astronomer
Jaak Panksepp (1943–2017), psychobiologist, neuroscientist (USA) 
Erast Parmasto (1928–2012), mycologist
Georg Friedrich Parrot (1767–1852)
Johann Friedrich Parrot (1791–1841), physician, explorer
Jaan Puhvel (born 1932), linguist (USA) 
Ludvig Puusepp (1875–1942), medical scientist, neurosurgeon
Georg Wilhelm Richmann (1711–1753), physicist
Hillar M. Rootare (1928–2008), chemist
Mart Saarma (born 1949), molecular biologist
Thomas Seebeck (1770–1831), physicist
Otto Wilhelm von Struve (1819–1905), astronomer 
Svante Pääbo (born 1955), paleogeneticist (Sweden) 
Eduard von Toll (1858–1902?), geologist, Arctic explorer
Endel Tulving (born 1927), psychologist (Canada) 
Jakob von Uexküll (1864–1944), biologist, semiotician 
Lauri Vaska (1925–2015), chemist (USA)
Mihkel Veske (1843–1890), linguist, poet
Gustav Vilbaste (1885–1967), botanist
Edgar de Wahl (1867–1948), mathematician, creator of Interlingue

Literature and journalism
Artur Adson (1889–1977), poet
Artur Alliksaar (1923–1966), poet
Betti Alver (1906–1989), poet
Elise Aun (1863–1932), poet
Johannes Barbarus (1890–1946), poet
Nikolai Baturin (1936–2019), writer
Aimée Beekman (born 1933), writer
Vladimir Beekman (1929–2009), poet, novelist, translator
Eduard Bornhöhe (1862–1923), writer
Ernst Enno (1875–1934), poet
Friedrich Robert Faehlmann (1798–1850), writer, physician
August Gailit (1891–1960), writer
Ado Grenzstein (1849–1916), journalist
Lehte Hainsalu (born 1938), poet, novelist, children's author 
Indrek Hargla (born 1970), writer, screenwriter
Sass Henno (born 1982), writer
Helen Hindpere, writer
August Wilhelm Hupel (1737–1819), ecclesiastic writer, ethnologist
Ivar Ivask (1927–1992), literary scholar, critic, poet
Carl Robert Jakobson (1841–1882), journalist, political activist
Johann Voldemar Jannsen (1819–1890), journalist, political activist
Fred Jüssi (born 1935), journalist, champion of wildlife
Ain Kaalep (1926–2020), poet
Bernard Kangro (1910–1994), poet, writer, journalist
Jaan Kaplinski (1941–2021), writer, journalist, politician
Doris Kareva (born 1958), poet
Kaur Kender (born 1971), writer
August Kitzberg (1855–1927), writer
Albert Kivikas (1898–1978), writer
Andrus Kivirähk (born 1970), writer
Lydia Koidula (Lydia Jannsen, 1843–1886), poet
Madis Kõiv (1929–2014), author, physicist and philosopher
Friedrich Reinhold Kreutzwald (1803–1882), physician, writer, author of national epic
Jaan Kross (1920–2007), writer
Kalle Kurg (born 1942), poet, writer, critic, translator
Paul Kuusberg (1916–2003), writer
Kalle Lasn (born 1942), founder of Adbusters magazine
Kalju Lepik (1920–1999), poet
Juhan Liiv (1864–1913), poet, writer
Martin Lipp (1854–1923), poet
Viivi Luik (born 1946), poet
Oskar Luts (1887–1953), writer
Iko Maran (1915–1999), writer
Otto Wilhelm Masing (1763–1862), pastor, philologist, journalist
Uku Masing (1909–1985), poet, theologian, ethnologist
Lennart Meri (1929–2006), writer, politician
Kersti Merilaas (1913–1986), poet, playwright
Mait Metsanurk (1879–1957), writer
Mihkel Mutt (born 1953), writer, critic
August Mälk (1900–1987), writer
Ellen Niit (1928–2016), children's writer, poet and translator
Minni Nurme (1917–1994), writer and poet
Tõnu Õnnepalu (aka Emil Tode, born 1962), writer
Ants Oras (1900–1982), writer and translator
Eeva Park (born 1950), writer and poet
Aino Pervik (born 1932), children's author
Kristjan Jaak Peterson (1801–1822), poet
Lilli Promet (1922–2007), writer
Eno Raud (1928–1996), children's book author
Mart Raud (1903–1980), writer
Hugo Raudsepp (1883–1952), playwright
Karl Ristikivi (1912–1977), writer, poet
Aarne Ruben (born 1971), writer
Paul-Eerik Rummo (born 1942), poet, politician
Balthasar Russow (c. 1536–1600), chronicler
Peeter Sauter (born 1962), writer
Johannes Semper (1892–1970), writer, poet
Juhan Smuul (1922–1971), writer, poet
Gustav Suits (1883–1956), poet
Heiti Talvik (1904–1947), poet
Harald Tammer (1899–1942), journalist
A. H. Tammsaare (1878–1940), writer
Mats Traat (born 1936), author, poet
Tõnu Trubetsky (born 1963), writer, musician, film director
Friedebert Tuglas (1886–1971), writer, critic, literary scholar
Marie Under (1883–1980), poet
Mati Unt (1944–2005), writer, stage director
Edgar Valter (1929–2006), writer, artist
Arvo Valton (born 1935), writer
Priit Vesilind (born 1943), journalist, photographer, author (United States)
Enn Vetemaa (born 1936), writer
Juhan Viiding (1948–1995), poet, actor
Paul Viiding (1904–1962), poet
Eduard Vilde (1865–1933), writer, journalist
Heiki Vilep (born 1960), writer
Henrik Visnapuu (1890–1951), poet, journalist
Gero von Wilpert (1933–2009), writer
Wimberg (Jaak Urmet; born 1979), journalist, poet
Hella Wuolijoki (1886–1954), writer, politician (Finland)

Military and seafaring
Avdy Andresson (1899–1990), minister of war in exile 
Fabian Gottlieb von Bellingshausen (1778–1852), geographer, navigator, admiral 
Alexander von Benckendorff (1783–1844), general, politician 
Konstantin von Benckendorff (1785–1828), general, diplomat 
Herbert Brede (1888–1942), general 
Aleksander Einseln (1931–2017), general, commander of defence forces 
Jacob De la Gardie (1583–1652), officer, statesman 
Otto Heinze (1877–1968), general
Nikolai Helk (1885–1942), general
Aleksander Jaakson (1892–1942), general, statesman
Martin Jervan (1891–1942), general
Otto von Kotzebue (1787–1846), geographer, navigator
Tarmo Kõuts (born 1953), admiral, politician
Adam Johann von Krusenstern (1770–1846), geographer, navigator
Julius Kuperjanov (1894–1919), officer
Ants Laaneots (born 1948), general
Johan Laidoner (1884–1953), general, politician
Andres Larka (1879–1942), general, politician
Hans Leesment (1873–1944), general
Lembitu of Lehola (died 1217), tribal elder, military commander
Andres Nuiamäe (1982–2004), first Estonian soldier killed in action in Iraq
Karl Parts (1886–1941), officer
Johan Pitka (1872–1944?), admiral, politician
Ernst Põdder (1879–1932), general
Viktor Puskar (1889–1943), officer
Alfons Rebane (1908–1976), officer, intelligence operative
Nikolai Reek (1890–1942), general
Harald Riipalu (1912–1961), officer
Paul Maitla (1913–1945), officer
Harald Nugiseks (1921–2014), officer
August Sabbe (1909–1978), anti-Soviet armed resistance fighter 
Jaan Soots (1880–1942), general 
Aleksander Tõnisson (1875–1941), general
Jaan Usin (1887–1941), navy officer, commander of the Peipsi flotilla
Ferdinand von Wrangel (1796–1870), Arctic explorer

Music

Evald Aav (1900–1939), composer, choir conductor
Juhan Aavik (1884–1982), composer, conductor
Urmas Alender (1953–1994), pop musician
Olav Ehala (born 1950), composer
Heino Eller (1887–1970), composer
Olari Elts (born 1971), conductor
Gustav Ernesaks (1908–1993), composer, conductor
Eda-Ines Etti ("Ines", born 1981), pop musician
Miina Härma (1864–1941), composer, conductor
Maarja-Liis Ilus ("Maarja", born 1980), pop musician
Johann Voldemar Jannsen (1819–1890), conductor, journalist
Neeme Järvi (born 1937), conductor
Paavo Järvi (born 1962), conductor
Piret Järvis (born 1984), rock musician
Joonatan Jürgenson (born 1991), classical pianist
Artur Kapp (1878–1952), composer
Eugen Kapp  (1908–1996), composer
Tõnu Kaljuste (born 1953), conductor
Mari Kalkun (born 1986), folk singer
Paul Kostabi (born 1962), musician 
Maarja Kivi (born 1986), rock/metal musician
Triinu Kivilaan (born 1989), model, pop/rock musician
Eri Klas (1939–2016), conductor 
Kerli Kõiv ("Kerli", born 1987), musician, songwriter
Cyrillus Kreek (1889–1962), composer
Lenna Kuurmaa (born 1985), rock musician
Heli Lääts (1932–2018), singer
Käbi Laretei (1922–2014), pianist, composer, writer
Artur Lemba (1885–1963), pianist, composer
Ott Lepland (born 1987), singer, actor
Ivo Linna (born 1949), singer, pop musician
Uno Loop (1930–2021), singer, musician, athlete, actor, educator
Mihkel Lüdig (1880–1958) composer, organist, choir conductor
Ester Mägi (1922–2021), composer
Tõnis Mägi (born 1948), singer, pop musician
Alo Mattiisen (1961–1996), composer
Maria Minerva (born 1988), experimental musician
Getter Jaani (born 1993), singer, actress
Sandra Nurmsalu (born 1988), singer
Maarja Nuut (born 1986), singer and violinist
Birgit Õigemeel (born 1988), singer
Georg Ots (1920–1975), opera singer
Tanel Padar (born 1980), pop musician
Rene Pais ("Syn Cole", born 1988), DJ, record producer
Arvo Pärt (born 1935), composer
Annely Peebo (born 1971), opera singer
Kristiina Poska (born 1978), conductor
Jaan Rääts (1932–2020), composer
Kalle Randalu (born 1955), pianist
Rein Rannap (born 1953), composer, pianist
Vardo Rumessen (born 1942), pianist, politician
Mart Saar (1882–1963), composer
Evelin Samuel (born 1975), pop musician
Mart Sander (born 1967), singer, actor
Urmas Sisask (born 1960), composer
Katrin Siska (born 1983), rock musician
Eduard Sõrmus (1878–1940), violinist
Lepo Sumera (1950–2000), composer
Eino Tamberg (1930–2010), composer
Kalmer Tennosaar (1928–2004), singer, TV journalist
Rudolf Tobias (1873–1918), composer
Helen Tobias-Duesberg (1919–2010), composer
Kärt Tomingas (born 1967), actress, singer-songwriter
Koit Toome (born 1979), pop musician
Veljo Tormis (1930–2017), composer
Tõnu Trubetsky (born 1963), singer, composer, writer
Eduard Tubin (1905–1982), composer
Erkki-Sven Tüür (born 1959), composer
Raimond Valgre (1913–1949), composer
Anne Veski (born 1956), pop musician
Asta Vihandi (1929–1993), opera singer, actress
Vello Viisimaa (1928–1991), singer, actor
Tommy Cash (rapper) (born 1991), rapper

Performing arts

Argo Aadli (born 1980), actor
Ott Aardam (born 1980), actor
Tõnu Aav (1939–2019), actor
Eino Baskin (1929–2015)
Taavi Eelmaa (born 1971), actor 
Herta Elviste (1923–2015), actress
Ants Eskola (1908–1989), actor
Ita Ever (born 1931), actress
Viiu Härm (born 1944), actress, poet
Kersti Heinloo (born 1976), actress
Evald Hermaküla (1941–2000), actor and director
Tanel Ingi (born 1976), actor
Jüri Järvet (1919–1995), actor
Ülle Kaljuste (born 1957), actress 
Tõnu Kark (born 1947), actor
Volli Käro (born 1940), actor
Carmen Kass (born 1978), supermodel
Kaljo Kiisk (1925–2007), actor, film director and politician
Miliza Korjus (1909–1980), opera singer, film actress
Hele Kõrve (born 1980), actress, singer
Risto Kübar (born 1983), actor
Tiiu Kuik (born 1987), model
Betty Kuuskemaa (1879–1966), actress
Lia Laats (1926–2004), actress
Lauri Lagle (born 1981), actor, director, screenwriter
Silvia Laidla (1927–2012), actress
Anu Lamp (born 1958), actress and director
Astrid Lepa (1924–2015), actress and director
Tiit Lilleorg (born 1941), actor
Raine Loo (1945–2020), actress
Aksella Luts (1905–2005), actress, screenwriter
Ain Lutsepp (born 1954), actor and politician
Theodor Luts (1896–1980), director and cinematographer
Ain Mäeots (born 1971), actor, director, producer
Laine Mägi (born 1959), actress and choreographer
Mait Malmsten (born 1972), actor
Heino Mandri (1922–1990), actor
Konstantin Märska (1896–1951), cinematographer
Marko Matvere (born 1968), actor
Laine Mesikäpp (1917–2012), actress, singer, folk song collector
Mikk Mikiver (1937–2006), stage director, actor
Ornella Muti (born 1955), film actress (Italy)
Gerd Neggo (1891–1974), dancer, choreographer
Ester Pajusoo (born 1934), actress
Paul Pinna (1884–1949), actor, stage director
Mirtel Pohla (born 1982), actress
Salme Poopuu (1939–2017), actress, filmmaker
Erik Norkroos (born 1969), cinematographer, producer, editor and director
Kalju Orro (born 1952), actor
Priit Pärn (born 1946), animated film maker, graphic artist
Leida Rammo (1924–2020), actress
Elsa Ratassepp (1893–1972), actress
Tõnis Rätsep (born 1947), actor, singer, educator, poet, playwright and author
Evi Rauer (1915–2004), actress
Salme Reek (1907–1996), actress
Enn Reitel (born 1950), film actor (UK)
Jaan Rekkor (1958), actor
Moonika Siimets (born 1980), film director
Meeli Sööt (born 1937), actress
Eero Spriit (born 1949), actor and producer
Arno Suurorg (1903–1960), actor
Mena Suvari (born 1979), actress (USA)
Aino Talvi (1909–1992), actress
Kärt Tomingas (born 1967), actress, singer
Tanel Toom (born 1982), Oscar-nominated film director and screenwriter
Jaan Tooming (born 1946), actor, theatre and film director and writer
Aarne Üksküla (1937–2017), actor
Lembit Ulfsak (1947–2017), actor
Olli Ungvere (1906–1991), actress and singer
Katariina Unt (born 1971), actress
Ivo Uukkivi (born 1965), actor and musician
Jan Uuspõld (born 1973), actor, musician
Viire Valdma (born 1960), actress
Ragne Veensalu (born 1986), actress
Kullar Viimne (born 1980), film director and cinematographer
Evelin Võigemast (born 1980), actress, singer
Priit Võigemast (born 1980), actor

Religion
Herman (Aav) (1878–1961), head of Finnish Orthodox Church
Jaan Kiivit, Jr (1940–2005), archbishop
Juhan Leinberg (1812–1885), founder of a religious sect (the Maltsvetians)
Kuno Pajula (1924–2012), archbishop
Andres Põder (born 1949), archbishop
Alexey Ridiger (Patriarch Alexius II, 1929–2008), head of Orthodox Church (Russia)
Arthur Võõbus (1909–1988), theologian, orientalist, church historian

Sport
Moonika Aava (born 1979), javelin thrower
Arvi Aavik (born 1969), wrestler
Aleksander Aberg (1881–1920), wrestler
Friedrich Amelung (1842–1909), chess player
Maret Ani (born 1982), tennis player
Ants Antson (1938–2015), speedskater, Olympic medalist
Marko Asmer (born 1984), racing driver
Lauri Aus (1970–2003), cyclist
Aleksei Budõlin (born 1976), judoka, Olympic medalist
Toomas Edur (born 1954), NHL hockey player
Jaan Ehlvest (born 1962), chess player
Eduard Ellman-Eelma (1902–1943), football player
August Englas (1925–2017), wrestler
Gunnar Friedemann (1909–1943), chess player
Jüri Jaanson (born 1965), rower, Olympic medalist
Georg Hackenschmidt (1878–1968), wrestler
Helger Hallik (born 1972), wrestler
Kaido Höövelson ("Baruto Kaito"; born 1984), sumo wrestler
Margus Hunt (born 1987), former discus thrower, former shot putter, American football player
Elvy Kalep (1899–1989), aviator
Kaia Kanepi (born 1985), tennis player
Meelis Kanep (born 1983), chess grandmaster
Gerd Kanter (born 1979), discus thrower, Olympic medalist
Osvald Käpp (1905–1995), wrestler, Olympic medalist
Paul Keres (1916–1975), chess player
Lionel Kieseritzky (1806–1853), chess player
Jaan Kikkas (1892–1944), weightlifter, Olympic medalist
Jaan Kirsipuu (born 1969), cyclist
Martin Klein (1884–1947), wrestler, Olympic medalist
Aleksander Klumberg (1899–1958), decathlete, Olympic medalist
Leo Komarov (born 1987), ice hockey player
Anett Kontaveit (born 1995), tennis player
Anton Koolmann (1899–1953), wrestler
Johannes Kotkas (1915–1998), wrestler, Olympic medalist
Albert Kusnets (1902–1942), wrestler, Olympic medalist
Marko Kristal (born 1973), football player
Leho Laurine (1904–1998), chess player
Tanel Leok (born 1985), motocross rider
Siim Liivik (born 1988), ice hockey player
Joel Lindpere (born 1981), footballer for New York Red Bulls and the Estonian National Team
Heino Lipp (1922–2006), decathlete
Jüri Lossmann (1891–1984), long distance runner, Olympic medalist
Arnold Luhaäär (1905–1965), weightlifter, Olympic medalist
Georg Lurich (1876–1920), wrestler
Epp Mäe (born 1992), wrestler
Jaak Mae (born 1972), skier, Olympic medalist
Markko Märtin (born 1975), rally driver
Tarmo Mitt (born 1977), World Strong Man
Martin Müürsepp (born 1974), basketball player
Heiki Nabi (born 1985), wrestler, Olympic medalist
Iivo Nei (born 1931), chess player
August Neo (1908–1982), wrestler, Olympic medalist
Alfred Neuland (1895–1966), weightlifter, Olympic medalist
Erki Nool (born 1970), decathlete, Olympic medalist
Mati Nuude (1941–2001), weightlifter and singer
Tõnu Õim (born 1941), chess player
Lembit Oll (1966–1999), chess player
Andres Oper (born 1977), football player
Kristjan Palusalu (1908–1987), wrestler, Olympic medalist
Indrek Pertelson (born 1971), judoka, Olympic medalist
Mart Poom (born 1972), football player
Eduard Pütsep (1898–1960), wrestler, Olympic medalist
Kristjan Rahnu (born 1979), decathlete
Ilmar Raud (1913–1941), chess player
Michael Roos (Mihkel Roos, born 1982), American football player
Salme Rootare (1913–1987), chess player
Vidrik Rootare (c. 1900–1985), chess player
Sven Salumaa (born 1966), tennis player
Erika Salumäe (born 1962), cyclist, Olympic medalist
Jane Salumäe (born 1968), marathon runner
Ortvin Sarapu (1924–1999), chess player (New Zealand)
Roman Steinberg (1900–1928), wrestler, Olympic medalist
Alfred Schmidt (1898–1972), weightlifter, Olympic medalist
Paul Felix Schmidt (1916–1984), chess player
Kristina Šmigun-Vähi (born 1977), skier, Olympic medalist
Tiit Sokk (born 1964), basketball player (1988 Olympic gold medalist for USSR)
Yuval Spungin (born 1987), Israeli footballer
Nikolai Stepulov (1913–1968), boxer, Olympic medalist
Toivo Suursoo (born 1975), ice hockey player
Jaan Talts (born 1944), weightlifter, Olympic medalist
Harald Tammer (1899–1942), journalist, athlete, weightlifter, Olympic medalist
Aleksander Tammert (born 1973), discus thrower, Olympic medalist
Ott Tänak (born 1987), rally driver
Jüri Tarmak (born 1946), high jumper, Olympic medalist
Tõnu Tõniste (born 1967), yachtsman, businessman, Olympic medalist
Toomas Tõniste (born 1967), yachtsman, businessman, Olympic medalist
Johannes Türn (1898–1993), chess player
Voldemar Väli (1903–1997), wrestler, Olympic medalist
Andrus Värnik (born 1977), javelin thrower
Andrus Veerpalu (born 1971), skier, Olympic medalist
 Siim-Sander Vene (born 1990), Estonian basketball player for Hapoel Jerusalem of the Israeli Premier League

Visual arts
Priidu Aavik (1905–1991), painter
Amandus Adamson (1855–1929), sculptor
Adamson-Eric (Erich Adamson, 1902–1968), painter
Ellinor Aiki (1893–1969), painter
Arnold Akberg (1894–1984), painter 
Peeter Allik (1966–2019), painter, black and white artist
Efraim Allsalu (1929–2006), painter
Jüri Arrak (1936–2022), painter
Alfred Hirv (1880–1918), painter 
Raivo Järvi (1954–2012), illustrator, politician
Mati Karmin (born 1959), sculptor
Elmar Kits (1913–1972), painter
Johann Köler (1826–1899), painter
Andres Koort (born 1969), painter and scenographer
Mark Kostabi (Kalev Mark Kostabi, born 1960), painter (United States)
Meeli Kõiva (born 1960), painter, installation and light artist, sculptor, cinematographer, producer and film director (Finland, United States)
Ants Laikmaa (1866–1943), painter
Leonhard Lapin (1947–2022), graphic, painter, sculptor, architect
Ivo Lill (1953–2019), glass artist
Olav Maran (born 1933), artist
Marko Mäetamm (born 1965), painter
Konrad Mägi (1878–1925), painter
Kadri Mälk (born 1958), jewelry artist
Lydia Mei (1896–1965), painter
Natalie Mei (1900–1975), painter
Juhan Muks (1899–1983), painter
Evald Okas (1915–2011), painter
Eduard Ole (1898–1995), painter
Ludvig Oskar (1874–1951), painter
Ülo Õun (1940–1988), sculptor
Tiit Pääsuke (born 1941), painter
Karl Pärsimägi (1902–1942), painter
Kaljo Põllu (1934–2010), painter, graphic artist
Kristjan Raud (1865–1943), graphic artist
Paul Raud (1865–1930), painter
Enn Roos (1908–1990), sculptor
Endel Ruberg (1917–1989), artist, educator
Richard Sagrits (1910–1968), painter
Michel Sittow (1469–1525), painter
Ülo Sooster (1924–1970), painter 
Anton Starkopf (1889–1966), sculptor
Aleksander Tassa (1882–1955), artist and writer 
Jaan Toomik (born 1961), painter
Nikolai Triik (1884–1940), painter
Teodor Ussisoo (1878–1959), furniture designer
Helge Uuetoa (1936–2008), painter
Aleksander Uurits (1888–1918), painter, graphic artist
Ado Vabbe (1892–1961), painter
Kuno Veeber (1898–1929), painter
Edmund S. Valtman (1914–2005), cartoonist (USA)
Annes Varjun (1907–1986), ceramic artist
Eduard Viiralt (Eduard Wiiralt, 1898–1954), graphic artist
Kiino Villand (born 1969), photographer (USA)
Ilon Wikland (born 1930), illustrator (Sweden)

Other
Mari Raamot (1872–1966), activist

See also
 100 great Estonians of the 20th century